Kenya Airports Authority (KAA) is the owner and operator of nine civilian airports and airstrips in Kenya. Kenya Airports Authority was established by an act of Parliament in 1992, by the ruling Kenya African National Union government. The KAA Act, Cap 395, provides for the powers and functions of the Authority. Its head office is on the property of Jomo Kenyatta International Airport in Embakasi, Nairobi.

KAA Interests

Airports
 Jomo Kenyatta International Airport – Nairobi
 Moi International Airport – Mombasa
 Eldoret International Airport – Eldoret
 Wilson Airport – Nairobi
 Kisumu International Airport – Kisumu
 Isiolo International Airport 
 Malindi Airport – Malindi
 Wajir Airport – Wajir

Airstrips
 Lokichoggio Airport – Lokichoggio
 Manda Airport – Manda Island
 Ukunda Airport – Diani Beach

See also 

List of airports in Kenya

References

External links 
Kenya Airports Authority

 
Airport
Airports
Organisations based in Nairobi
Airport operators